Liberties College is an educational institution in Bull Alley Street, Dublin, Republic of Ireland. It offers further education courses, including Post Leaving Certificate courses.

The college is housed in an Edwardian building, described in the National Inventory of Architectural Heritage record as displaying elements of the "free Queen Anne idiom" and the "Flemish Renaissance" style.

The courses offered include Counselling, Health Care, Montessori Education, Social Studies, Tourism, and Information Technology.

At Liberties College many students avail of Back to Education and Training Support, via the BEA and VTOS schemes.

Liberties College is under supervision of the CDETB/City of Dublin Education and Training Board umbrella body.

See also
 Education in the Republic of Ireland
 List of further education colleges in the Republic of Ireland

References

External links
 Liberties College Official Website
 Profile on QualifaX, Ireland’s National Learners’ Database.

Education in the Republic of Ireland
Education in Dublin (city)
Further education colleges in Dublin (city)